John Henry FitzSimons (born 12 February 1943) is a British former track and field athlete who competed in the javelin throw. He is a former British record holder and was the first British man to throw the javelin beyond eighty metres.

He was the 1964 winner of the AAA Championships and was runner-up tin Finland's Jorma Kinnunen in 1966. As well as his 1966 gold, he returned to win a bronze medal at the 1970 British Commonwealth Games, helping England to the first ever medal sweep of the javelin by a nation, alongside compatriots Dave Travis and John McSorley. He represented Great Britain at the 1966 European Athletics Championships, but ranked only 22nd overall.

He also played minor counties cricket for Berkshire from 1960–1962, making eight appearances in the Minor Counties Championship.

International competitions

References

Living people
1943 births
English male javelin throwers
Commonwealth Games gold medallists for England
Commonwealth Games medallists in athletics
Athletes (track and field) at the 1966 British Empire and Commonwealth Games
Athletes (track and field) at the 1970 British Commonwealth Games
English cricketers
Berkshire cricketers
Medallists at the 1966 British Empire and Commonwealth Games
Medallists at the 1970 British Commonwealth Games